The 2016 Simpson Race Products Ginetta Junior Championship was a multi-event, one make motor racing championship held across England and Scotland. The championship featured a mix of professional motor racing teams and privately funded drivers, aged between 14 and 17, competing in Ginetta G40s that conformed to the technical regulations for the championship. It formed part of the extensive program of support categories built up around the British Touring Car Championship centrepiece. It was the tenth Ginetta Junior Championship, and commenced on 2 April 2016 at Brands Hatch – on the circuit's Indy configuration – and concluded on 2 October 2016 at the same venue, utilising the Grand Prix circuit, after twenty five races held at ten meetings, all in support of the 2016 British Touring Car Championship season.

Teams and drivers

Driver changes
Leaving Ginetta Juniors
 2015 Ginetta Junior champion Jamie Caroline advanced to MSA Formula with Jamun racing. 
 Senna Proctor moved to Renault Clio Cup U.K after two seasons in Ginetta Juniors.
 Dan Zelos also moved to 2016 Renault UK Clio Cup after two years of Ginetta Juniors.
 Billy Monger joined 2015 champion Jamie Caroline in MSA Formula.
 2015 rookie Patrik Matthiesen was promoted to MSA Formula 4.
 Matt Chapman moved to the Ginetta GT5 challenge, remaining with Total Control Racing.
 Sophia Flörsch made headlines withdrawing after 5 rounds and a double win at Thruxton in 2015. She spent the second half of 2015 preparing for the 2016 ADAC Formula 4 Championship with Motopark.
 Devlin DeFrancesco, having picked up the series during Sophia Flörsch's last round, moved onto MSA F4 with Carlin.
 Frank Bird also converted to Britain's MSA F4 with Fortec Motorsports for 2016.

Race calendar

Calendar changes
 This season saw the re-introduction of the triple-header meetings, having last hosted a triple-header meeting in 2007.

Championship standings

Drivers' championship
A driver's best 23 scores counted towards the championship, with any other points being discarded.

References

External links
 
 Ginetta Junior Series News

Ginetta Junior Championship season
Ginetta Junior Championship seasons